Rugby 15 is a rugby union video game developed by HB Studios and published by Bigben Interactive on PlayStation 4, Xbox One, PlayStation 3, Xbox 360, PlayStation Vita and PC. The game is notable for its negative reviews.

Details
Rugby 15  featured the Northern Hemisphere Rugby Union licenses while its only real rival in terms of Rugby Union video games, Rugby Challenge 3, featured the Southern Hemisphere licences. HB Studios had not developed a rugby union game since Rugby World Cup 2011, which was published by 505 Games. HB Studios then however announced the intention to start releasing an annual rugby game. This did not occur, and future videogames in the series were developed by a different studio.

Modes
It was possible to play an individual match with up to 4 local controllers, play in any of the licensed competitions or a custom created competition. The game does not feature a player and team customisation mode or a career mode. No online mode existed in the game as the developers want to focus on the basics of the game to improve for future editions, which may include an online mode.

Features
The weather would play a large part in gameplay with the wind affecting the projection of the ball and rain causing the pitch to deform and players to get muddy.

Teams and stadia
The game features licences for all clubs in the Top 14, Pro D2, Premiership and Pro12. There is one in-game stadium that is used for every team.

Reception

The game received overwhelmingly negative reviews, with IGN calling it an "utter disaster" and Official Xbox Magazine saying it was "easily the worst sports game we've played."

References

2014 video games
Video games developed in Canada
PlayStation 4 games
Xbox One games
PlayStation 3 games
Xbox 360 games
PlayStation Vita games
Rugby union video games
Windows games
Multiplayer and single-player video games
Nacon games
Maximum Games games
HB Studios games